Filodes is a genus of moths of the family Crambidae. The genus was described by Achille Guenée in 1854.

Species
Filodes baratalis Holland, 1900 
Filodes bilinealis Hampson, 1908 
Filodes cocytusalis Walker, 1859
Filodes costivitralis Guenée, 1862
Filodes decoloralis Snellen, 1899
Filodes fulvibasalis Hampson, 1898
Filodes fulvidorsalis Hübner, 1832
Filodes malgassalis Mabille, 1900
Filodes mirificalis Lederer, 1863
Filodes normalis Hampson, 1912
Filodes obscuralis Strand, 1920
Filodes patruelis Moore, 1888
Filodes sexpunctalis Snellen, 1890
Filodes tenuimarginalis Hampson, 1918
Filodes xanthalis Hampson, 1898

Former species
Filodes abnormalis Plötz, 1880 
Filodes adustalis Ghesquière, 1942 
Filodes alboterminalis Kenrick, 1917

References
 Encyclopedia of Life - Filodes

Spilomelinae
Crambidae genera
Taxa named by Achille Guenée